The Tootal, Broadhurst and Lee Building (currently marketed as  The Tootal Buildings) at No. 56 Oxford Street, in Manchester, England, is a late Victorian warehouse and office block built in a neo-Baroque style for Tootal Broadhurst Lee, a firm of textile manufacturers.

History
It was designed by J. Gibbons Sankey and constructed between 1896 and 1898.  It has been designated a Grade II* listed building.

Nikolaus Pevsner's The Buildings of England describes the warehouse as "large, in red brick stripped with orange terracotta, but comparatively classical".  It has a "massive central round-headed doorway with banded surround and cartouche dated 1896, set in (an) architrave of coupled banded columns and (a) broken pediment".

The interior has been redesigned, but a First World War memorial by Henry Sellers has been retained, being "marble, with a niche from which the figure (has been) stolen".

Behind it and not visible from Oxford Street is Lee House, the stub of what would have been the tallest building in Europe at 217 ft., a 17-storey warehouse of the same firm (planned 1928; part completed 1931). Both Churchgate House and Lee House are on the north bank of the Rochdale Canal; Great Bridgewater Street is immediately to the north of them.

Occupants
The building currently hosts the headquarters of the Greater Manchester Combined Authority including the office of the Mayor of Greater Manchester.

See also

Grade II* listed buildings in Greater Manchester
Listed buildings in Manchester-M1
Manchester cotton warehouses

Notes

References
 Hartwell, Clare; Hyde, Matthew & Pevsner, Nikolaus, The Buildings of England: Lancashire: Manchester and the South East (2004) Yale University Press
 Hartwell, Clare, Pevsner Architectural Guides: Manchester (2002) Yale University Press
 British Listed Buildings
 Churchgate & Lee House Website

External links
 The Tootal Buildings

Commercial buildings in Manchester
Office buildings in Manchester
Warehouses in England
Grade II* listed buildings in Manchester
Grade II* listed commercial buildings
Grade II* listed industrial buildings
Grade II* listed office buildings
Victorian architecture in England